Christian Beck may refer to:

 Christian Beck (poet) (1879–1916), Belgian poet
 Christian Beck (footballer) (born 1988), German footballer
 Christian Daniel Beck (1757–1832), German philologist, historian, theologian and antiquarian